Azmatullah Omarzai (born 24 March 2000) is an Afghan cricketer. He made his international debut for the Afghanistan cricket team in January 2021.

Domestic career
He made his List A debut for Mis Ainak Region in the 2017 Ghazi Amanullah Khan Regional One Day Tournament on 10 August 2017. He made his first-class debut for Speen Ghar Region in the 2018 Ahmad Shah Abdali 4-day Tournament on 25 March 2018.

In September 2018, he was named in Paktia's squad in the first edition of the Afghanistan Premier League tournament. He made his Twenty20 debut for Paktia Panthers in the 2018–19 Afghanistan Premier League on 7 October 2018. In September 2020, he was the joint winner of the player of the tournament award in the 2020 Shpageeza Cricket League.

International career
In December 2017, he was named in Afghanistan's squad for the 2018 Under-19 Cricket World Cup. In December 2018, he was named in Afghanistan's under-23 team for the 2018 ACC Emerging Teams Asia Cup. In November 2019, he was named in Afghanistan's squad for the 2019 ACC Emerging Teams Asia Cup in Bangladesh. In February 2020, he was named in Afghanistan's Twenty20 International (T20I) squad for their series against Ireland. In January 2021, he was named in Afghanistan's One Day International (ODI) squad for their series against Ireland. He made his ODI debut for Afghanistan, against Ireland, on 21 January 2021.

In March 2021, the Afghanistan Cricket Board confirmed that he was pending selection for the T20I matches against Zimbabwe, once his visa issues had been resolved. In February 2022, he was named in Afghanistan's T20I squad for their series against Bangladesh. He made his T20I debut on 3 March 2022, for Afghanistan against Bangladesh.

References

External links
 

2000 births
Living people
Afghan cricketers
Afghanistan One Day International cricketers
Afghanistan Twenty20 International cricketers
Mis Ainak Knights cricketers
Spin Ghar Tigers cricketers
Paktia Panthers cricketers
Place of birth missing (living people)